CloneDVD is a proprietary DVD cloning software, developed by Elaborate Bytes, that can be used to make backup copies of any DVD movie not  copy-protected. The program is able to transcode a dual layer DVD movie to fit it onto a DVD-R,  DVD+R or DVD+R DL (Double Layer) disc. Users also have the choice to strip audio streams, subtitles and chapters. This is called customize. For example, users can edit and delete certain parts of a DVD that they don't want burned, such as the main menu, bonus features, commentary, or certain scenes from the actual DVD. By moving a quality bar (or by selecting a standard optical disc format) the user can make the DVD fit its target medium.

Another feature of this software is its ability to save the contents of the disc as an ISO image, or as individual DVD files (i.e. in a VIDEO_TS directory). Conversely, CloneDVD can write a DVD from an ISO image and from a directory of individual DVD files. Consequently, CloneDVD can process a folder of DVD files (i.e. on another storage medium) and convert it into an ISO image. It cannot, however, convert an ISO image directly into a directory of DVD files, but this is possible to do by first mounting the image into a virtual drive using a disk image emulator, such as Virtual CloneDrive. CloneDVD supports DVD recording speeds of up to 18x.

See also
SlySoft
AnyDVD
CloneCD
HandBrake
DVD Shrink
DVD Decrypter
K9Copy
DVD ripper software with similar features

References

External links
Elaborate Bytes (software developer)
Another CloneDVD guide
CloneDVD FAQ

Optical disc authoring software
DVD rippers
Windows-only shareware